Jingyu is a town in and the county seat of Jingyu County, south-central Jilin province, China. A military rocket launch site is near this town. The DF-4 is one example of rockets to be tested there.

See also
Rocket launch site

External links
Article title

Baishan
Township-level divisions of Jilin